Sir Matthew Fetherstonhaugh, 1st Baronet  (c. 1714 – 18 March 1774) was an English politician and landowner.

He was the son of Matthew Fetherstonhaugh of Featherstone Castle, Northumberland. In 1746, he inherited the estates of a kinsman Sir Henry Fetherston but not Sir Henry's baronetcy which became extinct on his death. However, on 3 January 1747, Fetherstonhaugh was created a baronet of Featherstonehaugh in the County of Northumberland, in the Baronetage of Great Britain.

On his marriage to Sarah Lethieullier, sister of Benjamin Lethieullier, in December 1746, he bought Uppark, Sussex and the manors of East And West Harting and in 1747 sold the family estate at Featherstone to James Wallace. Between 1748 and 1753 he undertook the Grand Tour with his brother-in-law Benjamin Lethieullier and his step brother-in-law Lascelles Iremonger. They brought back to Uppark an impressive collection of Italian art.

In February 1752, Fetherstonhaugh was elected Fellow of the Royal Society, as 'A gentleman of literature and improvement, and versed in natural knowledge'. He was proposed by Willoughby de Parham, James Burrow,  Peter Davall, Israel Mauduit and James Theobald.

He served as a Member of Parliament (MP) for Morpeth from 1755 to 1761 and for Portsmouth from 1762 to 1774. In the 1750s he commissioned architect James Paine to design and build Dover House, Whitehall, London.

He was succeeded by his son, Henry.

In 1774, he commissioned Vandalian Tower.

References

Sources 
 A History of Northumberland (1840) John Hodgson Pt 2 Vol 3 p355
 

1774 deaths
Members of the Parliament of Great Britain for Morpeth
Members of the Parliament of Great Britain for Portsmouth
Baronets in the Baronetage of Great Britain
Fellows of the Royal Society
British MPs 1754–1761
British MPs 1761–1768
British MPs 1768–1774
Year of birth uncertain